Guduru may refer to:

Gudur, a town in Nellore district, Andhra Pradesh, India
Guduru, Krishna district, a village in Krishna district, Andhra Pradesh, India
Guduru mandal, Krishna district, Andhra Pradesh
Guduru (woreda), a district in Oromia Region, Ethiopia
Guduru, Ethiopia, a town, the administrative center of the woreda